Lesenya Ramoraka (born 4 April 1994- 4 October 2022) was a Motswana footballer who played as a left back for South African Premier Division side Highlands Park.

Career statistics

Club

International

References

1994 births
Living people
Botswana footballers
Botswana international footballers
Association football fullbacks
Orapa United F.C. players
Highlands Park F.C. players
South African Premier Division players
Botswana expatriate footballers
Expatriate soccer players in South Africa
Botswana expatriate sportspeople in South Africa
People from Central District (Botswana)